The following is a list of county roads in Hillsborough County, Florida.  All county roads are maintained by the county in which they reside, however not all of them are marked with standard MUTCD approved county road shields.

County routes in Hillsborough County

References

FDOT map of Hillsborough County, Florida
FDOT GIS data, accessed January 2014

 
County